Egypt Lane Historic District is a national historic district located at East Hampton, New York in Suffolk County, New York. The district includes six contributing buildings; three principal buildings and three outbuildings.  The principal buildings are dwellings in the Colonial Revival, Federal, and Saltbox styles.

It was added to the National Register of Historic Places in 1988.

References

External links
Egypt Lane Historic District map (Living Places.com)

Historic districts on the National Register of Historic Places in New York (state)
East Hampton (village), New York
Historic districts in Suffolk County, New York
National Register of Historic Places in Suffolk County, New York